The Hours is a 2002 drama film directed by Stephen Daldry and written by David Hare. The screenplay is based on the novel of the same name by Michael Cunningham, which follows three generations of women whose lives are affected by the novel Mrs Dalloway: Virginia Woolf (Nicole Kidman), as she writes the novel in 1923, a suicidal 1950s housewife (Julianne Moore), and a modern-day woman (Meryl Streep) preparing a party for her poet friend, Richard (Ed Harris). The film premiered on December 25, 2002, followed by a limited theatrical release on December 27, and then went on a wide release in North America on January 14, 2003. The Hours grossed a worldwide box office total of over $108 million, against an estimated budget of $25 million.

The Hours garnered various awards and nominations following its release, with nominations ranging from recognition of the film itself to Hare's screenplay, Philip Glass' score and the cast's acting performances, particularly those of Kidman, Moore and Streep. The film received nine nominations at the 75th Academy Awards; Kidman won the Best Actress award at the ceremony. At the 56th British Academy Film Awards, The Hours won two awards from eleven nominations. It earned seven nominations at the 60th Golden Globe Awards, and went on to win the Best Drama Film and Best Actress accolades. It was also named Best Foreign Feature Film at the Amanda Awards.

During the Berlin International Film Festival, Kidman, Moore and Streep tied for the Silver Bear for Best Actress. Film editor Peter Boyle received an American Cinema Editors nomination for his work, and casting director Daniel Swee won the Casting Society of America's Best Drama Film Casting accolade. The Deutscher Filmpreis awarded The Hours Best Foreign Film, while the GLAAD Media Awards named it Outstanding Wide Release Film. Moore earned a Best Actress award from the Los Angeles Film Critics Association, while Streep was given the award for Best Performance by an Actress in a Leading Role from Outfest, an LGBT-oriented film festival.

The film was nominated for a total of eight awards from the 7th Golden Satellite Award and 9th Screen Actors Guild Award ceremonies. The Hours won three Vancouver Film Critics Circle Awards from five nominations, including Best Supporting Actress for Toni Collette. Collette also won the Boston Society of Film Critics Award for Best Supporting Actress. Hare and Cunningham were given the 2002 USC Scripter Award for Best Screenplay. The Writers Guild of America named Hare the winner of the Best Adapted Screenplay award, while the London Film Critics' Circle named him British Screenwriter of the Year.

Accolades

Notes

References
General

 

Specific

External links
 

Lists of accolades by film